A limited dependent variable is a variable whose range of
possible values is "restricted in some important way."   In econometrics, the term is often used when
estimation of the relationship between the limited dependent variable
of interest and other variables requires methods that take this
restriction into account.  For example, this may arise when the variable
of interest is constrained to lie between zero and one, as in
the case of a probability, or is constrained to be positive,
as in the case of wages or hours worked.

Limited dependent variable models include:

 Censoring, where for some individuals in a data set, some data are missing but other data are present;
 Truncation, where some individuals are systematically excluded from observation (failure to take this phenomenon into account can result in selection bias);
 Discrete outcomes, such as binary decisions or qualitative data restricted to a small number of categories. Discrete choice models may have either unordered or ordered alternatives; ordered alternatives may take the form of count data or ordered rating responses (such as a Likert scale).

See also 
 Logit, logit model, ordered logit 
 Multivariate probit models
 Probit, probit model, ordered probit
 Tobit model

See also
 Censored regression model
 Selection bias
 Truncated regression model

References

Regression analysis
Design of experiments